Kirya (an ancient Hebrew nickname for Jerusalem) is a 1992 album by Israeli singer Ofra Haza. Intended as the follow-up to Haza’s internationally successful Shaday (1988) and Desert Wind (1989) albums, it built on her successful blend of Electronic dance music and traditional Middle Eastern sounds, being a logical next step for Haza.  Musically, it applied the sensibilities of pop producer Don Was to traditional song writing and instrumentation; lyrically, it delivered powerful themes of longing, joy, and the plight of the downtrodden in several languages, much like Haza's earlier work.

Along with producer Was, Haza was joined by other Western musicians, including a featured duet with Iggy Pop on "Daw Da Hiya", a song about a girl sentenced to death for becoming pregnant out of wedlock while the man responsible remains free. Music videos were made for two of the album's tracks, "Daw Da Hiya" and "Innocent" - "A Requiem for Refugees".

In 1993, the album was nominated for a Grammy in the "Best World Music Album" category, an achievement which to this day has not been matched by any other Israeli singer.

Track listing

"Kirya" (Traditional, Haza, Aloni) - 6:11
"Horashoot – The Bridge" (Traditional, Ben Amram, Haza, Aloni) - 3:46
"Innocent" – A Requiem for Refugees (Haza, Aloni) - 4:46
"Trains of No Return" (Haza, Aloni) - 4:15
"Mystery Faith and Love" (Haza, Aloni) - 5:24
"Daw Da Hiya" (featuring Iggy Pop) (Haza, Aloni, Morriss) - 4:55
"Don't Forsake Me" (Traditional, Shabazi, Haza, Aloni) - 4:35
"Barefoot" (Haza, Aloni) - 5:14
"Take 7/8" (Amram, Haza, Aloni) - 4:35
"Today I'll Pray" (Bonus track certain editions) (Haza, Aloni) - 4:33

Charts

Personnel
 Ofra Haza – lead vocals
 Iggy Pop – vocals/narration
 Harry Hyman Vento – violin
 John Belezikjian – violin
 Tzur Ben-Zelev – acoustic bass
 David McMurray – saxophone
 Professor Ali Jihad Racy – percussion
 Rodrigo Manuel – percussion
 Ed Cherney – background vocals
 Mortonette Jenkins – background vocals 
 Natalie Jackson – background vocals
 Marlena Jetter – background vocals
 Valerie Carter – background vocals
 Mark Goldenberg – background vocals, electric guitar, accordion, harmonium

Production
 Don Was – record producer
 Ofra Haza – producer
 Bezalel Aloni – producer
 Recorded at Microplant, Conway, Devonshire, England; Record Plant Studios, Los Angeles, California; Bee Studio, Bahia, Brazil.

References

1992 albums
Ofra Haza albums
Albums produced by Don Was
East West Records albums